John McLeish (19 December 1926 – 10 December 2005) was an Australian rules footballer who played with Essendon in the Victorian Football League (VFL). McLeish's father, Maurie, played VFL football for St Kilda.

After a season and a half with Essendon, McLeish returned to the team he was recruited from, Yea, where he was appointed captain-coach. They won a premiership in his first season in the role. McLeish continued to play with Yea until 1954.

McLeish won the 1945 Goulburn Valley Football Association best and fairest / Shepparton Advertiser Trophy, when playing for Dookie College.

Notes

External links 
		

Essendon past player profile

1926 births
2005 deaths
Australian rules footballers from Victoria (Australia)
Essendon Football Club players